Ola Hanson (June 25, 1864 in Åhus, Sweden – October 17, 1929 in St. Paul, Minnesota) was a Swedish-American missionary who worked with the Kachin people in Burma. 
Hanson came to the United States in 1881, settling in Oakland, Nebraska. He attended the Swedish Baptist (later Bethel) Seminary in St. Paul, Minnesota, graduated from Madison Theological Seminary in Hamilton, New York, and was ordained in 1890.

Hanson was sent to Kachin State in 1890 by the American Baptist Missionary Union to help William Henry Roberts, who was running a Kachin mission in Bhamo city, and was followed in 1892 by George J. Geis, who established a mission at Myitkyina.  
His team formulated an orthography for the Kachin language using the Latin alphabet, and created a grammar and Katchin–English dictionary. He then began translating the Bible into Kachin.
Hanson established a mission in Namkham in the Hsenwi District in 1910. He wrote The Kachins, Their Customs and Traditions (Rangoon, 1913) and Missionary Pioneers among the Kachins (New York, 1922). 
After living with the Kachin people for 28 years, he returned to his native Nebraska in 1928. He died in St. Paul, Minnesota, on October 17, 1929.

References

External links

People from Oakland, Nebraska
Baptist missionaries from the United States
Swedish Baptist missionaries
Baptist missionaries in Myanmar
1929 deaths
1864 births
American expatriates in Myanmar
Swedish emigrants to the United States
19th-century Baptists
20th-century Baptists
People from Kristianstad Municipality
Linguists from the United States
19th-century linguists
20th-century linguists
Missionary linguists